Junction City is a village in Portage County, Wisconsin, United States. The population was 439 at the 2010 census.

History
The village grew up around the meeting point of two important railroad lines: the East-West route of the former Soo Line Railroad from Stevens Point to Marshfield, and the North-South route of the former Milwaukee Road from Wisconsin Rapids to Wausau. Both rail lines are now part of Canadian National Railway.

Geography
Junction City is located at  (44.591291, -89.764435).

Demographics

2010 census
As of the census of 2010, there were 439 people, 169 households, and 115 families living in the village. The racial makeup of the village was 92.5% White, 0.2% African American, 0.2% Native American, 4.1% Asian, 1.4% from other races, and 1.6% from two or more races. Hispanic or Latino of any race were 3.2% of the population.

There were 169 households, of which 37.3% had children under the age of 18 living with them, 53.8% were married couples living together, 8.9% had a female householder with no husband present, 5.3% had a male householder with no wife present, and 32.0% were non-families. 27.8% of all households were made up of individuals, and 10.7% had someone living alone who was 65 years of age or older. The average household size was 2.60 and the average family size was 3.12.

The median age in the village was 31.6 years. 30.3% of residents were under the age of 18; 7.3% were between the ages of 18 and 24; 27.5% were from 25 to 44; 23.2% were from 45 to 64; and 11.6% were 65 years of age or older. The gender makeup of the village was 48.3% male and 51.7% female.

2000 census
As of the census of 2000, there were 440 people, 169 households, and 106 families living in the village. The population density was 370.4 people per square mile (142.8/km2). There were 193 housing units at an average density of 162.5 per square mile (62.6/km2). The racial makeup of the village was 96.82% White, 1.59% Asian, 0.45% from other races, and 1.14% from two or more races. Hispanic or Latino of any race were 4.32% of the population.

There were 169 households, out of which 33.7% had children under the age of 18 living with them, 45.6% were married couples living together, 13.0% had a female householder with no husband present, and 36.7% were non-families. 31.4% of all households were made up of individuals, and 15.4% had someone living alone who was 65 years of age or older. The average household size was 2.60 and the average family size was 3.24.

In the village, the population was spread out, with 31.8% under the age of 18, 7.7% from 18 to 24, 31.4% from 25 to 44, 16.4% from 45 to 64, and 12.7% who were 65 years of age or older. The median age was 33 years. For every 100 females, there were 95.6 males. For every 100 females age 18 and over, there were 88.7 males.

The median income for a household in the village was $33,750, and the median income for a family was $42,031. Males had a median income of $31,375 versus $22,727 for females. The per capita income for the village was $17,648. About 13.9% of families and 15.8% of the population were below the poverty line, including 25.2% of those under age 18 and 12.8% of those age 65 or over.

References

External links
 Junction City Website

Villages in Wisconsin
Villages in Portage County, Wisconsin